Sherine Ahmed El Zeiny (born 23 February 1991) is a Dutch-Egyptian artistic gymnast. Born in the Netherlands, El Zeiny trained all of her gymnastics career in the Netherlands, but she competed for her mother's homeland Egypt in numerous international tournaments since 2007, including three editions of the Summer Olympics (2008, 2012, and 2016).

References

External links
 
 
 

1991 births
Living people
Egyptian female artistic gymnasts
Gymnasts at the 2008 Summer Olympics
Gymnasts at the 2012 Summer Olympics
Gymnasts at the 2016 Summer Olympics
Olympic gymnasts of Egypt
Sportspeople from Alphen aan den Rijn
Dutch female artistic gymnasts